Ladislav Rakovac (December 6, 1847 – April 14, 1906) was a Croatian physician.

He was born in Varaždin. After completing his degree in medicine in Vienna and specialization in internal medicine as the first Croatian internist, in 1874-1880 he led the internal department of the Bolnica milosrdne braće hospital in Zagreb. Afterwards and until 1892 he served as a secretary of the Health Department of the Provincial Government, and was responsible for many health laws and regulations improving the state of public health in Croatia. As a president of the Croatian Medical Association (1880-1882, and in 1893-1906) he is credited for bringing the association to a high scientific and organizational level, and in his honor the Ladislav Rakovac Award has been established for contributions to the improvement of the Association.

He died in Zagreb.

References

1847 births
1906 deaths
Physicians from Zagreb
People from Varaždin